John Waine  (20 June 193029 December 2020) was Bishop of Chelmsford from 1986 to 1996; and previously Bishop of St Edmundsbury and Ipswich from 1978 to 1986, Bishop of Stafford, 1975–1978.  He also served as Clerk of the Closet from 1989 to 1997, and in retirement served as a lay member on the Press Complaints Commission.

Educated at Prescot Grammar School and the University of Manchester, he studied for ordination at Ridley Hall, Cambridge before embarking on an ecclesiastical career with a curacy at St Mary's Church, West Derby, Liverpool; served a second curacy in Sutton Parish (in the same diocese); Incumbencies at Ditton, Southport and Kirkby in the same diocese followed, before consecration to the episcopate on 24 June 1975 by Donald Coggan, Archbishop of Canterbury, at St Paul's Cathedral. He was translated to become Bishop of St Edmundsbury and Ipswich in November 1978, serving until he became Bishop of Chelmsford in 1986. Having become Bishop of Chelmsford shortly beforehand at the confirmation of his election, he was enthroned at Chelmsford Cathedral on 31 May 1986 and he retired on 30 April 1996. He received an honorary doctorate from the University of Essex. Waine was also the Prelate of the Venerable Order of Saint John until 24 June 2007.

At Petertide 1984 (1 July), as Bishop of St Edmundsbury and Ipswich, he made his son, Stephen (now Dean of Chichester), a deacon, at St Edmundsbury Cathedral (by letters dimissory from the vacant See of Lichfield).

Honours
On 15 November 1996, Waine was appointed Knight Commander of the Royal Victorian Order (KCVO).  On 12 November 1999 he was appointed Bailiff Grand Cross of the Order of St John (GCStJ).

Honour Ribbons:
: Knight Grand Cross of the Royal Victorian Order (GCVO)
: Bailiff Grand Cross of the Order of St. John (GCStJ)

References

1930 births
Clerks of the Closet
Bishops of Stafford
Bishops of Chelmsford
Bishops of St Edmundsbury and Ipswich
Knights Commander of the Royal Victorian Order
Alumni of the University of Manchester
2020 deaths
People educated at Prescot Grammar School
20th-century Church of England bishops